"Hey Boy" is a song by British pop group Take That. It was released through Polydor Records on 16 October 2015 as the fourth single from the seventh studio album, III, originally released in 2014, although this song only appears on the 2015 Edition. The song was written by Take That and produced by Greg Kurstin and features Mark Owen, Gary Barlow and Howard Donald on lead vocals.

Background
On completion of Take That's sell out European tour, Take That Live 2015, the band announced they would be re-releasing their number one-album, III, with 4 new songs. "Hey Boy", one of these new songs, was announced as the third single from the album in advance of the record. The single follows an electro-pop style that the band adopt in III with Howard Donald describing the single as the "most excited" he has been about a release in a "long time".

Live performances
Take That performed the single live for the first time on the day it was released to radio on 16 October 2015. The band performed the single on TFI Friday, the first time the band had played on the show.

Music video
The music video for "Hey Boy" was filmed in New York City and features the band dressed up as 70s pop stars walking through the streets and into a nightclub while performing the song.

Critical reception
The single received positive reviews upon its release, with Entertainment Focus calling it "an 80s influenced track featuring chunky synths and a big chorus." The Manchester Evening News called it "uptempo and catchy" continuing by saying that "'Hey Boy' is in the same vein as the winning formula of 'These Days', the song that brought us all onto the dancefloor at weddings this summer." The review concluded by stating that "it has a driving bassline and lyrics to sing along with in the car. What's not to love?"

Personnel
Gary Barlow – co-lead vocals
Mark Owen – co-lead vocals
Howard Donald – co-lead vocals

Track listing
Digital download
"Hey Boy" – 3:43

UK CD single
 "Hey Boy" – 3:43

Other versions
 7th Heaven Club Mix – 7:38
 7th Heaven Radio Edit – 3:54

Chart performance

Weekly charts

Release history

References

2015 songs
2015 singles
Take That songs
Pop ballads
Songs written by Gary Barlow
Songs written by Mark Owen
Songs written by Howard Donald
Polydor Records singles
Songs written by Jamie Norton
Songs written by Ben Mark
Song recordings produced by Greg Kurstin